The Sigsbee Escarpment is a major bathymetric feature of the Gulf of Mexico, extending for about . It has formed as a result of salt tectonics, due to the effects of loading of a thick layer of Jurassic halite (Louann Salt) by Upper Jurassic to Cenozoic sedimentary rocks.

References

External links
 Video showing more information about the escarpment and its context

Landforms of the Gulf of Mexico